Constantine Phaulkon (Greek: Κωνσταντῖνος Γεράκης, Konstantinos Gerakis; γεράκι is the Greek word for "falcon"; also known as Costantin Gerachi, Capitão Falcão in Portuguese and simply as Monsieur Constance in French; 1647 – 5 June 1688) was a Greek adventurer who became chief minister to King Narai of the Ayutthaya Kingdom and assumed the Thai noble title "Chao Phraya Wichayen" (เจ้าพระยาวิชาเยนทร์).

Origins
Constantine Phaulkon was born to Greek parents within Assos Castle in the region of Erisso (pertinenza di Erisso) on northern Cephalonia (then under Venetian rule).  His father's name was Zuane (Greek: Τζουγάνης that is John) and his mother's is still unknown. The Gerakis (Γεράκης) / Gerachi family was already established there, in the village of Plagia (Πλαγιά), since the 16th century.

Early career
At age 13, Phaulkon left Cephalonia on an English ship and spent the next ten years of his life living in London. It was then, that his name “Gerachi” was anglicised into “Falcon”, before its re-Hellenization into “Phaulkon”. He may have served in the Royal Navy and fought the Dutch under the command of Prince Rupert of the Rhine during the Second Anglo-Dutch War. In 1669, Phaulkon sailed to Bantam on an English ship, the Hopewell as assistant gunner and enlisted as a clerk in the English East India Company. His time as assistant gunner within the company also coincided with the Third Anglo-Dutch war. He made friends with senior Company official Richard Burnaby and trader George White as well as his younger brother Samuel. While assistant gunner, Phaulkon came to Siam (present day Thailand), as a merchant in 1675 after working for England's East India Company. Phaulkon became fluent in Siamese language in just a few years  (he was also fluent in English, French, Portuguese, and Malay). In 1679, Burnaby presented Phaulkon into the service of the Phra Khlang Kosa Lek to help facilitate the trade. In 1681, Lek introduced him into the court of King Narai and Phaulkon began to work as an interpreter, quickly gained the royal favor. Due to his experience with the East India Company,  he also worked in the treasury.

Rise to power
There were many accounts to Phaulkon's rise to power and winning the favour of King Narai. One of which was his efficiency in accounting, in which he investigated a claim by Persian traders that the treasury had owed them debt. Phaulkon came to the conclusion that it was the Persian traders whom owed the treasury after his inspection of the account; garnering much revenue for the treasury at the expense of the traders. Another story suggests that King Narai wanted to investigate the weight of a cannon. Phaulkon proceeded to place the cannon on a boat, and marked a waterline. He then removed the cannon and filled the boat with rice until it reaches the drawn waterline.
Due to Phaulkon's competence and administrative abilities, as well as his knowledge of Europe, King Narai came to favour him greatly.  In 1682, Phaulkon abandoned Anglicanism for Catholicism and soon after married a Catholic woman of mixed Japanese-Portuguese-Bengali descent named Maria Guyomar de Pinha. They lived a life of affluence as Phaulkon rose to become highly influential at the Siamese court of King Narai. Their marriage brought two sons, George "Jorge" Phaulkon and  Constantin "João" Phaulkon.

In 1683 Phaulkon suggested a plan to King Narai for the construction of the fort of Mergui in polygonal European style, which was strongly opposed by Kosa Lek. Lek was later accused of receiving bribes from peasants who did not want to be drafted into the Mergui construction and was later flogged with rattan sticks under the King's orders. Lek died due to the injuries inflicted on him about a month later in July, and his properties were later confiscated. King Narai offered Lek's former position to Phaulkon, which he declined and instead accepted the advisory role to the Malay noble Okya Wang, who had assumed the position.

In 1686, Phaulkon was a commander in the royal forces during the suppression of the Makassar Revolt. He personally led the troops during the fighting and was almost killed in combat. In the aftermath of the suppression, Phaulkon oversaw the punishments of the rebel prisoners as well as deserters.

French rapprochement

Following troubles with the English and the Dutch, Phaulkon engineered a Franco-Siamese rapprochement leading to the exchange of numerous embassies between France and the Ayutthaya Kingdom, as well as the dispatch of an expeditionary force by the French by 1687. Phaulkon, called Monsieur Constance by the French and addressed cher ami by their king, was their main ally for several years. In recognition King Louis XIV of France awarded him with the knighthood of the Order of Saint Michael, a hereditary title in the French nobility as well as French citizenship for him and his family. King Narai had hoped to use the French as a counterweight to Dutch influence. The embassy of Chevalier de Chaumont in 1685 further strengthened ties between the two Kingdoms, Chaumont also being accompanied by Jesuit Guy Tachard and French naval commander Claude de Forbin, who would remain to serve King Narai as Governor of Bangkok, as well as training Siamese troops in European tactics with the Thai title Ok-Phrasaksongkram. Forbin would later become the subject of Phaulkon's bitter jealousy.

During Tachard's presence in Siam, Phaulkon plotted to secure his power and influence; through secret diplomacy with the Jesuit. He drafted a letter requesting Frenchmen to be sent from France, whom he would to use his power to place in political and military offices, as his supporters, and under his patronage. Phaulkon also requested that King Louis XIV send troops and warships to secure the southern port city of Singora, which has been conceded to France by King Narai. The Greek favourite of King Narai also offered the concession of the port of Mergui, previously held by Phaulkon's English pirates- to French control, of which the King consented to eventually. Phaulkon became a prime counsellor to the king in 1685 and expresses a desire to designate a Catholic successor to King Narai, most likely, Phra Pi, who was Narai's adopted son and a Catholic convert, as well as scheming to convert the Kingdom to Catholicism, albeit peacefully, by winning the masses over through charity and alms.  Phaulkon wanted a successor who would uphold amiable relations with France and offer privileges to the French, which would guarantee his political standing and security in a court that has grown increasingly hostile to his influence and power.

King Narai proceeded to send an embassy to France in response, led by Kosa Pan. An audience was granted by King Louis XIV at Versailles and the embassy toured the French country.

Feud with the East India Company
As a result of his meteoric rise to power and King Narai's trust in him, Phaulkon's old English colleagues from the East India Company such as Richard Burnaby and Samuel White were given positions of power. A substantial number of Englishmen and women also left the company's jurisdiction, instead pledging fealty to King Narai due to their favoured status and settled in the Ayutthaya Kingdom. Burnaby was made the governor of Mergui and White became its Harbourmaster. However the two Englishmen entrusted with the port of Mergui had old vendettas against the Kingdom of Golconda in a past trading dispute, and proceeded to use their newly acquired power to engage in piracy and warfare against Golconda and Indian shipping. This led to retaliation by the East India Company under President Elihu Yale in 1687, who subsequently sent Anthony Weltden with two warships to punish Burnaby and White, as well as demanding recompense from the Ayutthaya Kingdom. The company was also able to obtain an order from King James II forbidding Englishmen serving on foreign ships, due to the excess of Englishmen abandoning Company service for preferential treatment in the Ayutthaya Kingdom.

Upon arrival of Weltden's ships, Burnaby and White were cowed into opening the gates and receiving the Company forces, who came ashore. During the negotiations, the local Siamese suspected White and Burnaby of treachery and rallied under the Governor of Tenasserim who led the massacre of many Englishmen and women in Mergui.

Richard Burnaby was slain in the slaughter but Weltden and White escaped with their lives, retreating into the sea. The butchery by the Governor also involved an ugly scene in which innocent Englishmen and women were slain, including an Englishwoman who was tortured and killed with her children for refusing the Governor's advances. When King Narai had heard of the transgressions against innocent English civilians, he had the Governor of Tenasserim summoned to Lopburi and executed, at Phaulkon's behest. War was also declared on the East India Company.

Character
The Abbé de Choisy, who was a member of the first French embassy to Thailand in 1685, wrote about M. Phaulkon's character:

Downfall and death
Phaulkon's closeness to the king earned him the envy of some Thai members of the royal court, which would eventually prove to be his undoing. When King Narai became terminally ill, a rumor spread that Phaulkon wanted to use the designated heir, Phra Pi, as a puppet and actually become ruler himself, according to Thai historical records this was in fact a credible claim. This provided credence for Pra Phetracha, the foster brother of Narai to stage a coup d'état, the 1688 Siamese revolution. In Lopburi on 31 March 1688, Phaulkon had a discussion with the French general Marshal Desfarges for the plans to put down Petracha's plot before the latter moved to the fort in Bangkok, however a month later on 15 April, Desfarges was persuaded by Frenchmen Véret and Abbé de Lionne to abandon plans to go to Lopburi to help Phaulkon and remained in his fort instead.

On 18 May, King Narai, Phra Pi, and their followers were arrested. Phaulkon was summoned to the palace, where he and his 21 men were surrounded by the Siamese soldiers and disarmed. He was taken to the palace dungeon where he would be restrained and brutally tortured. Phra Pi was later decapitated on 20 May, his head was thrown at the feet of Phaulkon, with the remarked "See, there is your king". On 25 May, Desfarges was summoned to Lopburi by Phetracha and arrived on 2 June. He said nothing about saving Phaulkon, and Petracha assumed that the French had abandoned Phaulkon.

On 5 June 1688, Desfarges departed Lopburi, leaving his two sons there as hostages. Phaulkon was made to hang Phra Pi's head around his neck and Phetracha declared him guilty of high treason. Phaulkon was placed on the silver palanquin mounted on his elephant, and was led out by Phetracha's men to the area of Wat Sak temple in the evening, where Luang Sorasak decapitated and also disemboweled him as witnessed by Father de Bèze. His remains are buried in the shallow grave in front of Wat Sak, but on that same day, his remains were later dug up and eaten by scavenging dogs. When King Narai learned what had happened, he was furious, but was too weak to take any action. Narai died several days later on 11 July 1688, virtually a prisoner in his own palace. Phetracha then proclaimed himself the new king of Siam and began his regime which expelled almost all French troop from the kingdom.

Legacy
The different interpretations of Phetracha's motivation for ordering the arrest and execution of Phaulkon have made his position in Thai history somewhat controversial. Supporters of Phetracha's actions have depicted Phaulkon as an opportunistic Greek foreigner, who sought to use his influence to control of the kingdom on the behalf of Western interests. More skeptical historians have believed that Phaulkon was simply a convenient scapegoat and a means for Phetracha to seize the throne from the rightful heir by capitalizing on the envy and the suspicion that Phaulkon had engendered.

In popular culture
Phaulkon was portrayed by the Thai-Scottish actor Louis Scott in the 2018 Thai drama Buppesunniwas and received critical acclaim for his performance. Phaulkon was depicted as a complex character and as cruel, abusive, cunning, and overly-ambitious but also capable of compassion, love, and remorse. Scott won a TVG Award for the best male supporting actor.

Notes

References 
 Smithies, Michael (2002), Three military accounts of the 1688 "Revolution" in Siam, Itineria Asiatica, Orchid Press, Bangkok, .
 Luang Sitsayamkan (1967), The Greek Favourite of the King of Siam, Donald Moore Press, Singapore.
 Cangelaris, Panagiotis D. (2011), History and Genealogy of the Cangelari Family of Cephalonia (16th-20th Centuries), Corfu 2011 (in Greek; online), .
 Cangelaris, Kefalonitiki Proodos, No. 3: Παναγιώτης Δ. Καγκελάρης, "Κωσταντής Γεράκης (Constance Phaulkon) - Μια νέα γενεαλογική προσέγγιση", from: Η Κεφαλονίτικη Πρόοδος, Περίοδος Β', τεύχος 3 (Ιούλιος-Σεπτέμβριος 2012; in Greek).
 Cangelaris, Kefalonitiki Proodos, No. 7: Παναγιώτης Δ. Καγκελάρης, "Το γαλλικό οικόσημο του πρωτοσύμβουλου Κωσταντή Γεράκη (Constance Phaulkon)", from: Η Κεφαλονίτικη Πρόοδος, Περίοδος Β', τεύχος 7 (Ιούλιος-Σεπτέμβριος 2013; in Greek).

External links 
 
 George A. Sioris, Phaulkon - The Greek First Counsellor at the Court of Siam: An Appraisal, Bangkok 1988 .
 Memoires de Siam - Les personnages - Phaulkon, Monsieur Constance (in French)
 Panayotis D. Cangelaris: "Costantin Gerachi (Constance Phaulkon) - A new genealogical approach" (reprint in Greek)
 Panayotis D. Cangelaris: "The French coat of arms of prime counsellor Costantin Gerachi (Constance Phaulkon)" (reprint in Greek)

1647 births
1688 deaths
17th-century Greek people
Converts to Roman Catholicism from Anglicanism
Greek expatriates in the Ayutthaya Kingdom
Greek people of Venetian descent
Greek Roman Catholics
People from Cephalonia
Nobility of the Ayutthaya Kingdom
Constantine Phaulkon
Samuhanayok
Royal favourites
Constantine Phaulkon
Constantine Phaulkon